Dagli Appennini alle Ande may refer to:
 Dagli Appennini alle Ande (1959 film), an Italian-Argentine film
 Dagli Appennini alle Ande (1943 film), an Italian drama film